The 2018 Cavan Senior Football Championship was the 110th edition of Cavan GAA's premier gaelic football tournament for senior graded clubs in County Cavan, Ireland. The tournament consists of 12 teams, with the winner representing Cavan in the Ulster Senior Club Football Championship.

The championship starts with a league stage and then progresses to a knock out stage. The draw for the group stages of the championship were made on 30 April 2018.

Due to reconstruction of the stadium in 2018, Breffni Park was not used as a venue for any matches during this season's championship, except for the final.

Cavan Gaels were the defending champions, but they lost to Gowna at the quarter-final stage.

Castlerahan won their first title, defeating Crosserlough in the final.

Team Changes
The following teams have changed division since the 2017 championship season.

To Championship
Promoted from 2017 Cavan Intermediate Football Championship
  Shercock  -  (Intermediate Champions)

From Championship
Relegated to 2018 Cavan Intermediate Football Championship
  Arva 
  Cuchulainns 
  Mullahoran

League stage
All 12 teams enter the competition at this stage. A random draw determines which teams face each other in each of the four rounds. No team can meet each other twice in the group stage. The top 8 teams go into a seeded draw for the quarter-finals while the bottom 4 teams will enter a Relegation Playoff. If teams are level on points and a place in the quarter-final is at stake, a Playoff will be conducted to determine who goes through.

Round 1

Round 2

Round 3

Round 4

Knock-Out Stage

Quarter-finals

Semi-finals

Final

Relegation play-offs
The 4 bottom placed teams the league phase will play off against each other. The 2 winners will maintain their senior status for 2019 while the 2 losers will face off in a Relegation-Final. The ultimate loser will be relegated to the 2019 Intermediate Championship.

References

External links
 Cavan at ClubGAA
 Official Cavan GAA Website

Cavan Senior Football Championship
Cavan GAA Football championships
Cavan SFC